Medallion Theatre, aka Chrysler Medallion Theatre, is a 30-minute American anthology series that aired on CBS from July 11, 1953, to April 3, 1954. Henry Fonda (in the premiere telecast "The Decision of Arrowsmith"), Claude Rains, and Janet Gaynor made their major television dramatic debuts on this series in various 1953 episodes. Others guest stars included Helen Hayes, Charlton Heston, Ronald Reagan, Jack Lemmon, Rod Steiger, and Roddy McDowell.  Among its writers were Rod Serling and Robert Anderson. Directors included Ralph Nelson, Don Medford, Robert Stevens, and Seymour Robbie. The original producer was William Spier.

Premise
Spier said that older short stories were selected for their quality: "Thirty or forty years ago, writers knew content better, and by using their stories we hope to get what we're aiming at, dramas with fiber and dimension."

Production
All thirty episodes were aired live from New York. Mort Abrahams was associate producer, Samuel Leve was the set designer, and Robert Tallman the story editor.

Reaction
Ben Gross of the New York Daily News said it was "a welcome recruit to the ranks of live dramatic shows". Columnist John Crosby was intrigued at the show's extracting a storyline for its premiere episode from a longer work, and praised the cast, writing, and all-around production.

Broadcast history
By mid-February 1954 columnist Erskine Johnson reported that CBS had decided to replace Medallion Theater with a new sitcom called That's My Boy. About the same time, the producer role was taken over by Mort Abrahams.

Episodes

References

External links
Medallion Theatre at CVTA with episode list

1950s American anthology television series
1953 American television series debuts
1954 American television series endings
American live television series
CBS original programming
Black-and-white American television shows